Shahzada Pratap Singh Bahadur (1831 – 15 September 1843) or Tikka Sahib was the eldest son of Sher Singh, Maharaja of Sikh Empire. His mother was Maharani Prem Kaur.

He was installed as heir apparent with the title of Tikka Sahib by his father, at Lahore Fort, 27 January 1841.

He was killed by Ajit Singh Sandhanwalia with his father and Wazir Dhian Singh Dogra, 15 September 1843.

Gallery

Notes

Sikh Empire
1831 births
1843 deaths